Photobiotin is a derivative of biotin used as a biochemical tool.  It is composed of a biotin group, a linker group, and a photoactivatable aryl azide group.

The photoactivatable group provides nonspecific labeling of proteins, DNA and RNA probes or other molecules. Biotinylation of DNA and RNA with photoactivatable biotin is easier and less expensive than enzymatic methods since the DNA and RNA does not degrade.  Photobiotin is most effectively activated by light at 260-475 nm.

References

Billingsley, M. and J. Polli.  “Preparation, characterization and biological properties of biotinylated derivatives of calmodulin.” Biochem J. 275 Pt 3(1991): 733–743
"EZ-Link Photoactivatable Biotin." Pierce Biotechnology, Inc. Rockford, IL: June, 2003.
"Components of Avidin-Biotin Technology: A Handbook." Pierce Biotechnology, Inc. Rockford, IL: June, 2003.
"Photobiotin acetate." Sigma-Aldrich, Co. 2006.
"Photoprobe biotin", Vector Laboratories, Inc., www.vectorlabs.com.

Biotechnology